Stonemyia tigris is a species of fly in the family Tabanidae.

Distribution
Iran, Transcaucasus.

References

Tabanidae
Insects described in 1880
Diptera of Asia
Taxa named by Jacques-Marie-Frangile Bigot